Beroe, commonly known as the cigar comb jellies, is a genus of comb jellies in the family Beroidae. Beroe exhibits bioluminescence.

Species
According to the World Register of Marine Species, the following species are members of this genus:

Beroe abyssicola Mortensen, 1927
Beroe australis Agassiz & Mayer, 1899
Beroe baffini Kramp, 1942
Beroe basteri Lesson, 1830
Beroe campana Komai, 1918
Beroe compacta Moser, 1909
Beroe constricta Chamisso & Eysenhardt, 1821
Beroe cucumis Fabricius, 1780
Beroe culcullus Martens, 1829
Beroe cyathina A. Agassiz, 1860
Beroe flemingii (Eschscholtz, 1829)
Beroe forskalii Milne Edwards, 1841
Beroe gilva Eschscholtz, 1829
Beroe gracilis Künne, 1939
Beroe hyalina Moser, 1907
Beroe macrostoma Péron & Lesueur, 1808
Beroe mitraeformis Lesson, 1830
Beroe mitrata (Moser, 1907)
Beroe ovale Bosc, 1802
Beroe ovata Bruguière, 1789
Beroe pandorina (Moser, 1903)
Beroe penicillata (Mertens, 1833)
Beroe ramosa Komai, 1921
Beroe roseus Quoy & Gaimard, 1824
Beroe rufescens (Eschscholtz, 1829)

References

Further reading

Ctenophore genera
Nuda